Qəhrəmanlı (also Qahramanli, Kagramanli and Kagramanly) is a village and municipality in the Beylagan Rayon of Azerbaijan.  It has a population of 2,032.

References 

Populated places in Beylagan District